Utica Square is an upscale outdoor shopping center located in Tulsa, Oklahoma. The mall is anchored by a branch of the Saks Fifth Avenue chain (which opened at Utica Square in 1986). The shopping center features a number of smaller, mostly independent shops.

Utica Square opened on May 22, 1952 as Tulsa's first suburban shopping center. Helmerich & Payne, Inc., an energy company, purchased Utica Square in 1964, and bought Miss Jackson's in 2001.

Previous anchor stores included Renberg's (closed 1998), John A. Brown Department Store (converted to Dillard's in 1984; Dillard's closed 2001), T G & Y, and C.R. Anthony. Current stores include American Eagle, Ann Taylor, Anthropologie, Banana Republic, Coach, Talbots, Williams Sonoma, Pottery Barn, L’Occitane, Restoration Hardware, Starbucks, and JoS. A. Bank Clothiers.  A medical building was built in 1956 and demolished in 2002.

Utica Square is mentioned frequently in P.C. and Kristin Cast's House of Night books.

Anchors
Saks Fifth Avenue (48,000 square feet)

See also
Leading shopping districts by city

References

External links
 Official website

Buildings and structures in Tulsa, Oklahoma
1952 establishments in Oklahoma
Shopping malls in Oklahoma
Economy of Tulsa, Oklahoma
Tourist attractions in Tulsa, Oklahoma